Nicolas Henri René de Grimouard (Fontenay-le-Comte, 25 January 1743 – Rochefort, 7 February 1794) was an officer in the French Navy.  He served in the War of American Independence, and became a member of the Society of the Cincinnati.

Career 
Grimouard joined the Navy as a Garde-Marine in 1758. He served on Inflexible in 1759 under Conflans. In 1770, he was promoted to Ensign, and to Lieutenant in 1778. He took part in fixe cruises of the escadre d'évolution.

In 1779, Grimouard commanded the frigate Minerve. He captured the British Debora, and took part in the Battle of Grenada on 6 July 1779. That same year, he was made a Knight in the Order of Saint Louis.

In the action of 4 January 1781, Minerve was captured by HMS Courageux. Grimouard was wounded and taken prisoner, to be exchanged soon afterwards.

He took part to the capture of Tobago and the capture of Grenada under de Grasse. At the Battle of the Saintes, on 12 April 1782, Grimouard was first officer on Magnifique, under Macarty Macteigue.

He later took command of the 74-gun Scipion, and fought in the action of 18 October 1782, where he was wounded. Louis XVI made him a count after the battle, and commissioned a painting of the action from Rossel.

Grimouard was promoted to contre-amiral in July 1792, and was appointed commander of the naval forces in Brest. In January 1793, he was promoted to Vice-amiral.

During the Reign of Terror in the French Revolution, Grimouard was guillotined in Rochefort on 7 February 1794.

Sources and references 
 Notes

Citations

Bibliography
 
 
 

External
 

French Navy officers
1743 births
1794 deaths